All in a Day's Work may refer to:

All in a Day's Work, a 2005 album by Bob Baldwin
All in a Day's Work, a 2009 album by Saigon
"All in a Day's Work", a song by Eels on Shootenanny!
"All in a Day's Work", a song from the Tomorrow Never Dies soundtrack